Kyle Holcomb (born February 24, 2000) is an American soccer player.

Playing career

Youth, college and amateur
Holcomb San Marcos High School, but played club soccer instead with local USSDA side Pateadores from 2012. Holcomb won a national title with Pateadores in 2013.

In 2018, Holcomb chose to attended Wake Forest University to play college soccer. In four seasons, including a truncated 2020 season due to the COVID-19 pandemic, Holcomb made 71 appearances for the Deamon Deacons, scoring 33 goals and tallying eight assists, coming in tied for seventh in program history for career goals scored. Holcomb was named All-ACC Third-Team Selection in 2020, was Wake Forest Most Valuable Player in the 2020–21 season, and All-ACC First-Team Selection and All-ACC Academic Team Selection in 2021.

While at college, Holcomb competed in the USL League Two, making two appearances for Orange County SC U23.

MLS SuperDraft
On January 11, 2022, Holcomb was selected 29th overall in the 2022 MLS SuperDraft by Charlotte FC. However, he was cut by the team in early February during their preseason.

Professional
On April 12, 2022, Holcomb signed his first professional contract with USL Championship club Charleston Battery. He made his debut on May 28, 2022, starting in a 1–1 draw with Loudoun United.

International career
Holcomb made his debut with the United States under-19's on May 7, 2018, in the 2018 Slovakia Cup against the Kazakhstan U–19's, scoring one goal in the 8-0 victory. He additionally appeared in the 3–0 win over Azerbaijan U-18's during a friendly game.

References

Living people
2000 births
American soccer players
Association football forwards
Charleston Battery players
Charlotte FC draft picks
Orange County SC U-23 players
People from San Marcos, California
Soccer players from California
United States men's youth international soccer players
USL Championship players
USL League Two players
Wake Forest Demon Deacons men's soccer players
Sportspeople from San Diego County, California